Cardington-Lincoln High School is a public high school in Cardington, Ohio. It is the only high school in the Cardington-Lincoln Local Schools district.

Ohio High School Athletic Association State Championships

 Boys Baseball – 1979 
 Boys Wrestling – 2000 Tom Smith

Cardington Athletics took home the MOAC ALL-SPORTS TROPHY in 2009–10.

Cardington recorded perfect seasons in 1950 and 1990, but the ’90 squad did not qualify for the playoffs. They Made the Playoffs in the 2020 Season When the Ohio High School Athletic Association had all teams Qualify due to the COVID-19 Pandemic. They Defeated Fisher Catholic 68-43 before getting Eliminated by Danville 46-20 the Following Week.

Notes and references

External links
 District Website
 MOAC
 Marist 
  MOAC Record Holders
  10 TV

High schools in Morrow County, Ohio
Public high schools in Ohio